Alfred Birch Sampson (27 May 1912 – 17 January 2001) was an Australian rules footballer who played for the Footscray Football Club in the Victorian Football League (VFL).

Family
The son of John Sampson (1884–1942) and Grace Ivy Sampson, nee Birch (1884–1954), Alfred Birch was born at Rupanyup on 27 May 1912. He was the younger brother of fellow Footscray player John Sampson.

War service
Sampson later served in the Royal Australian Air Force during World War II.

Notes

External links 

		
Alf Sampson's playing statistics from The VFA Project

1912 births
2001 deaths
Australian rules footballers from Victoria (Australia)
Western Bulldogs players
Williamstown Football Club players
Rupanyup Football Club players